The Consulate-General of Denmark in Saint Petersburg is the diplomatic mission of Denmark in Saint Petersburg, Russian Federation. It is located at 13 Bolshaya Alleya on Kamenny Island in Saint Petersburg.

On 6 October 1903, the land on which the consulate-general is situated was leased for 90 years to the Swiss tailor Edward Follenweider, who was the couturier to the Imperial Russian court and its royal guard. The house was designed in 1904 by the architect Roman Meltzer, who was one of the interior designers of the Winter and Alexander Palaces in Saint Petersburg, and was built in 1906 at a cost of 212,000 roubles.

After the October Revolution in 1917, Kamenny Island was renamed Workers' Island and the dachas were used by decree of Vladimir Lenin as rest homes, sanitoriums and housing for the homeless. Follenweider's Mansion, also known to locals as the Gingerbread House or Fairytale House, was handed over to the Leningrad Administration of Trade Unions and was transformed into a sanatorium for the treatment of diseases of the gastrointestinal tract.

In November 1992 the house was granted to the Royal Danish Government to house their consulate-general in Saint Petersburg.

See also 
 Denmark–Russia relations
 Diplomatic missions in Russia

References

External links 
  Consulate-General of Denmark in Saint Petersburg

Denmark–Russia relations
Denmark
Saint Petersburg
Government agencies established in 1992
1992 establishments in Russia